The German Army ("army") is the land component of the armed forces of Germany. The present-day German Army was founded in 1955 as part of the newly formed West German Bundeswehr together with the Marine (German Navy) and the Luftwaffe (German Air Force). , the German Army had a strength of 62,766 soldiers.

History

Overview
A German army equipped, organized, and trained following a single doctrine and permanently unified under one command was created in 1871 during the unification of Germany under the leadership of Prussia. From 1871 to 1919, the title Deutsches Heer (German Army) was the official name of the German land forces. Following the German defeat in World War I and the end of the German Empire, the main army was dissolved. From 1921 to 1935 the name of the German land forces was the Reichsheer (Army of the Empire) and from 1935 to 1945 the name Heer was used. The Heer was one of two ground forces of the Third Reich during World War II but, unlike the Heer, the Waffen-SS was not a branch of the Wehrmacht but was a combat force under the Nazi Party's own Schutzstaffel forces. The Heer was formally disbanded in August 1946.

After World War II, Germany was divided into the Federal Republic of Germany (West Germany) and the German Democratic Republic (East Germany), which both formed their own armed forces: on 12 November 1955 the first recruits began their service in the West German Heer, while on 1 March 1956 the East German Landstreitkräfte der NVA (Land Forces of the National People's Army) were founded. During the Cold War, the West German Army was fully integrated into NATO's command structure while the Landstreitkräfte were part of the Warsaw Pact. Following the process of German reunification in 1990, the Landstreitkräfte were partially integrated into the German Army. Since then, the German Army has been employed in peacekeeping operations worldwide and since 2002 also in combat operations in Afghanistan as part of NATO's International Security Assistance Force.

Founding of the Army

Following World War II the Allies dissolved the Wehrmacht with all its branches on 20 August 1946. However already one year after the founding of the Federal Republic of Germany in May 1949 and because of its increasing links with the West under German chancellor Konrad Adenauer, the Consultative Assembly of Europe began to consider the formation of a European Defence Community with German participation on 11 August 1950. Former high-ranking Wehrmacht officers outlined in the Himmeroder memorandum a plan for a "German contingent in an international force for the defense of Western Europe." For the German land forces the memorandum envisioned the formation of a 250,000 strong army. The officers saw the need for the formation of twelve Panzer divisions and six corps staffs with accompanying Corps troops, as only armoured divisions could muster a fighting force to throw back the numerically far superior forces of the Warsaw Pact.

Theodor Blank was appointed "officer of the Federal Chancellor for the Strengthening of Allied Troops questions". This Defence Ministry forerunner was known somewhat euphemistically as the Blank Office (Amt Blank), but explicitly used to prepare for the rearmament of West Germany (Wiederbewaffnung). By March 1954 the Blank Office had finished plans for a new German army. Plans foresaw the formation of six infantry, four armoured, and two mechanised infantry divisions, as the German contribution to the defense of Western Europe in the framework of a European Defence Community. On 8 February 1952 the Bundestag approved a German contribution to the defense of Western Europe and on 26 February 1954 the Basic Law of the Republic was amended with the insertion of an article regarding the defence of the sovereignty of the federal government. Following a decision at the London Nine Power Conference of 28 September to 3 October 1954, Germany's entry into NATO effective from 9 May 1955 was accepted as a replacement for the failed European Defence Community plan. Afterwards the Blank Office was converted to the Defence Ministry and Theodor Blank became the first Defence Minister. The nucleus of army was the so-called V Branch of the Department of Defence. Subdivisions included were VA Leadership and Training, VB Organisation and VC Logistics.

The army saw itself explicitly not as a successor to the defeated Wehrmacht, but as in the traditions of the Prussian military reformers of 1807 to 1814 and the members of the military resistance during National Socialism, such as the officers which undertook the failed 20 July plot to assassinate Adolf Hitler in 1944. Nevertheless, for lack of alternatives the officer corps was made up largely of former Wehrmacht officers. The first Chief of the Army was the former Wehrmacht General der Panzertruppe Hans Rottiger, who had been involved in the drafting of the Himmeroder memorandum.

The official date of the founding of the army is 12 November 1955 when the first soldiers began their service in Andernach. In 1956 the first troops set up seven training companies in Andernach and began the formation of schools and training centers. On 1 April 1957, the first conscripts arrived for service in the army. The first military organisations created were instructional battalions, officer schools, and the Army Academy, the forerunner to the Führungsakademie der Bundeswehr in Hamburg. In total of twelve armoured and infantry divisions were to be established by 1959, as planned in Army Structure I. To achieve this goal existing units were split approximately every six months. However the creation of all twelve divisions did not take place until 1965. At the end of 1958 the strength of the army was about 20,200 men. The army was equipped at first with American material, such as the M-47 Patton main battle tank. Three corps commands were formed beginning in 1957: the I Corps, II Corps, and the III Corps.

Also in 1957 the "Office for Territorial Defence" was established as the highest Territorial Army authority. The Office for Territorial Defence was under the direct command of the Federal Ministry of Defence and commanded the Territorial Army (Germany) (Territorialheer), a reserve formation. While the Heer along with the Marine and Luftwaffe were firmly integrated into the NATO Military Command Structure, the Territorialheer remained under national command. The main function of the Territorialheer was to maintain the operational freedom of NATO forces through providing rear area defence against saboteurs, enemy special forces, and the like. There were three Territorial Commands (Territorialkommandos), including North, South, and Schleswig-Holstein, and up to six Wehrbereichskommandos (WBKs), military regional commands. By 1985 each of the WBKs had two Heimatschutzbrigades (HSBs, home defence brigades).

The development of Soviet tactical nuclear weapons required the development of a new Army structure even before Army Structure 1 was fully achieved. To minimize the effects of attacks with tactical nuclear weapons on massed forces, the 28,000 strong divisions of the Heer were broken up into smaller and more mobile brigades under Army Structure 2. These smaller units were also to be capable of self-sustainment on a nuclear battlefield for several days, and to be capable of moving quickly from defense and to attack. The new armoured and mechanised brigades were capable of combined arms combat. Each division was composed of three brigades. The armoured brigades consisted of an armoured infantry battalion, two armoured battalions, a self-propelled artillery battalion and a supply battalion. The mechanised brigades consisted of a motorised infantry battalion, two mechanised infantry battalions, an armoured battalion, a field artillery battalion and a supply battalion. The motorised brigades consisted of three motorised infantry battalions, an anti-tank battalion, a field artillery battalion and a supply battalion. The alpine brigades consisted of three alpine battalions, a mountain artillery battalion and a supply battalion. By 1959 the Heer consisted of 11 divisions of 27 brigades, four Panzer (armoured), four Panzergrenadier (mechanised), two Jäger (motorised), and one Gebirgsjäger (alpine).

From roughly 1970 onward, Army Structure 3 saw the targeted number of 36 active brigades raised by 1975 while the 2nd and 4th Panzergrenadier divisions were reorganised into Jäger formations. The armies Fallschirmjäger (paratrooper) brigades were renamed into Luftlande (airborne) brigades and a third brigade (Luftlandebrigade 27) was formed.

Under Army Structure 4 from 1980/81 on, the German Army fielded 12 divisions (with 38 active brigades): six Panzer (armoured), four Panzergrenadier (mechanised), one Luftlande (airborne), and one Gebirgs (alpine) divisions. Ten active divisions were grouped into three corps: I German Corps as part of NATO's Northern Army Group, II German Corps and III German Corps as part of Central Army Group. The remaining heavy division (6th Panzergrenadier Division) was part of Allied Forces Baltic Approaches. In peacetime the 1st Airborne Division was assigned to II German Corps with its three brigades to be distributed among the three Corps respectively in wartime, forming a quick reaction reserve.  

The number of active brigades rose compared to Army Structure 3 due to two Heimatschutz territorial defense brigades (51 and 56) being assigned to the field army as part of a mechanised and mountain division respectively. The non-NATO assigned territorial army formed 10 further territorial defense brigades for rear area security at varying readiness levels, with most units being partially manned in peacetime and others being entirely non-active units with equipment in storage. 

Brigades in the field army grew to four combat battalions instead of three. Mechanised brigades typically consisted of one Panzer and three Panzergrenadier battalions, of which one was a partially active and mixed formation, containing a tank company and two mechanised companies. Armoured brigades similarly consisted of one Panzergrenadier and three Panzer battalions, with one armoured battalion being mixed and partially active (containing one mechanised and two tank companies).  

Mechanised infantry battalions in mechanised brigades typically had one of three companies equipped as motorised infantry with M113 APCs instead of Marder IFVs.

Post Cold War

After 1990, the Heer absorbed the Nationale Volksarmee, the armed forces of East Germany. The former East German forces were initially controlled by the Bundeswehr Command East under the command of Lieutenant General Jörg Schönbohm and disbanded on 30 June 1991. In the aftermath of the merger, the German Army consisted of four Corps (including IV Corps at Potsdam in the former DDR) with a manpower of 360,000 men. It was continuously downsized from this point. In 1994 III Corps was reorganised as the German Army Forces Command. In 1996, the 25th Airborne Brigade was converted into a new command leading the Army's special forces, known as the Kommando Spezialkräfte.

Logistics, CBRN defense, territorial defense and military police units were split off into the newly formed Joint Support Service and medical units into the Joint Medical Service in 2000. The transferred units continue to wear army uniforms.

The 2001 onwards restructuring of the German Army saw it move to a seven division structure – five mechanised (each with two mechanised brigades), one special forces, and one air assault.

In 2003, three Corps still existed, each including various combat formations and a maintenance brigade, as well as the I. German/Dutch Corps, a joint German-Netherlands organization, used to control in peacetime the 1st Panzer and 7th Panzer Divisions as well as Dutch formations. The 1st Panzer would have reported to the corps in wartime while the 7th would be posted to the Allied Rapid Reaction Corps. II Corps was German in peacetime but would have exchanged a division with the V U.S. Corps in time of war (the 5th Panzer). The 5th Panzer Division was formally disbanded as of 30 June 2001. In peacetime it also commanded the 10th Panzer Division, which was allocated to Eurocorps and which parents the German half of the Franco-German Brigade. The 1st Mountain Division at Munich was also subordinate to this headquarters.

The IV Corps was headquartered at Potsdam in eastern Germany and controlled two Panzergrenadier Divisions, the 13th and 14th. The 14th Panzergrenadier Division also took control of units in Western Germany re-subordinated from the 6th Panzergrenadier Division when it lost its command function. It would have made up the German contribution to the Multinational Corps Northeast in time of war. IV Corps also used to have under its command the Military District Command I, the 1st Airmobile Brigade, and the Berlin Command (:de:Standortkommando Berlin).

The current structure was assumed with the most recent German Army reform which also suspended conscription by 1 July 2011 and saw the army move to a purely professional three division structure with a view on creating smaller, more flexible and more deployable units, emphasising global employment against non-state threats such as international terrorism or as part of UN and EU missions.

, the German Army had a strength of 62,766 soldiers.

Structure and organisation

The German Army is commanded by the Inspector of the Army (Inspekteur des Heeres) based at the Army Command (Kommando Heer) in Strausberg near Berlin. The training centers are supervised by the Army Training Command in Leipzig.

The combat units of the army now include two armoured divisions and the lighter rapid forces division. Unlike other European armies such as neighbouring France, regiments are not a common form of organization and are thus rare in the German army. Battalions and regiments are directly subordinate to brigades or to divisions as divisional troops. German infantry battalions field 1,000 men, considerably larger than most NATO armies, (e.g. twice the size of a US Army battalion). While some brigades are still designated as either Panzer (armour) or Panzergrenadier (mechanised infantry) formations, these names are by now traditional and no longer imply a different organisation, for example an armoured brigade would not be expected to contain more tanks than a mechanised one.

  1. Panzerdivision in Oldenburg
 Panzerlehrbrigade 9, in Munster
 Panzer Brigade 21, in Augustdorf
 Panzergrenadier Brigade 41, in Neubrandenburg
 43 Mechanized Brigade (Royal Netherlands Army), in Havelte (Netherlands)
 Divisional troops

  10. Panzerdivision, in Veitshöchheim
 Panzer Brigade 12, in Cham
 Gebirgsjäger Brigade 23, in Bad Reichenhall
 Panzergrenadier Brigade 37, in Frankenberg
 Franco-German Brigade, in Müllheim
 Divisional troops

  Rapid Forces Division, in Stadtallendorf
 Airborne Brigade 1, in Saarlouis
 11 Airmobile Brigade (Royal Netherlands Army), in Schaarsbergen (Netherlands)
 Special Forces Command (KSK), in Calw
 Helicopter Command, in Bückeburg
 Divisional troops

  Eurocorps (German elements), in Strasbourg (France) 
 Command Support Brigade
 German elements in two permanent battalions and one staff company
  1 (German/Netherlands) Corps, in Münster
 German elements in two permanent battalions and one staff company
  Multinational Corps North East, in Szczecin (Poland) 
 610th Signal Battalion, in Prenzlau
  Central Army Depot, in Herongen
  Central Army Depot, in Pirmasens
  Central Mobilisation Base, in Brück

Equipment

Further vehicles include:

Armoured personnel carrier and fighting vehicles:
Puma (IFV) infantry fighting vehicle
Boxer (armoured fighting vehicle)
TPz Fuchs as armoured personnel carrier
ATF Dingo as armoured infantry mobility vehicle

Trucks:
Mercedes-Benz Zetros off-road transport truck
MAN KAT1 high-mobility off-road truck
Unimog all-wheel drive army personnel or equipment carriers

Truppengattungen 
The German Army has eleven different branches of troops, designated as Truppengattungen. Each Truppengattung is responsible for training and readiness of its units and disposes of its own schools and centres of excellence for doing so. Optically this distinction can be made by the branch colour, called Waffenfarbe which is displayed by a cord attached to the rank insignia, and the colour of their beret with a specific badge attached to it.

Beret Colour (Army only and Security Units of Navy and Air Force)
 Black: Armoured Corps, Reconnaissance Corps
 Green: Mechanised and Light Infantry Corps
 Dark Red: Aviation Corps, Airborne Corps, Special Forces, formations assigned to airborne division
 Light Red: Combat Support Corps and Military Police
 Dark Blue: Medical Corps
 Navy Blue: Multinational Units, Officer Cadet Battalions, Navy and Air Force Security Units
 Bright Blue: Troops with United Nations Missions
Grey mountain cap (Bergmütze): Mountain Troops Gebirgsjäger

Waffenfarbe (Army and army support branch only)

 Bright Red: General ranks (only Kragenspiegel, not Litze),
 Crimson: General Staff

Rank structure

The rank structure of the German army is adjusted to the rank structure of NATO. Unlike its predecessors, the modern German Army does not use the rank of Colonel General. The highest rank for an army officer is Lieutenant General, as the rank of Full General is reserved for the Armed Forces chief of staff or officers serving as NATO officers.

Officers

NCOs and enlisted

See also

 Bavarian Army
 History of Germany during World War II
 Imperial Army (German Empire) (to 1806)
 Kaiserliche Armee (1870–1918):
 Imperial German Army
 , the Airforce
 , the Navy
 Prussian Army
 Tank battalions of the German Army 1956–2008
List of military weapons of Germany

References

Further reading
 Addington, Larry H. The Blitzkrieg Era and the German General Staff, 1865–1941 (1971).
 Bartov, Omer. Hitler's army: Soldiers, Nazis, and war in the Third Reich (1992).
 Bull, Stephen. German Assault Troops of the First World War: Stosstrupptaktik—The First Stormtroopers (History Press, 2014).
 Citino, Robert M. The Path to Blitzkrieg: Doctrine and Training in the German Army, 1920–39 (2007).
 Citino, Robert M. Quest for Decisive Victory: From Stalemate to Blitzkrieg in Europe, 1899–1940 (2002).
 Dupuy, Trevor Nevitt. A Genius for War: The German Army and General Staff, 1807–1945 (1977).
 Gross, Gerhard P. The Myth and Reality of German Warfare: Operational Thinking From Moltke the Elder to Heusinger (2016). 
 Deist, Wilhelm, ed. The German Military in the Age of Total War (Berg, 1985).
 
 Hughes, Daniel J., and Richard L. DiNardo, eds. Imperial Germany and War, 1871–1918 (University Press of Kansas, 2018).
 Karau, Mark D. Germany's Defeat in the First World War: The Lost Battles and Reckless Gambles That Brought Down the Second Reich (ABC-CLIO, 2015).
 Kelleher,  Catherine M. "Fundamentals of German Security: The Creation of the Bundeswehr: Continuity and Change", in Stephen F. Szabo (ed.), The Bundeswehr and Western Security, (St. Martin's Press, New York, 1990).
 Lummel, Peter. "Food Provisioning in the German Army of the First World War." in Food and War in Twentieth Century Europe (Routledge, 2016) pp. 31-44.

 Seaton, Albert. The German Army: 1933-45 (1982).
 Showalter, Dennis (2016). Instrument of War: The German army 1914–18
 Showalter, Dennis (2015). The Wars of German Unification
  Online free

External links

 Official Homepage of the German Army (Heer)

Historical links
 German Army pre-1914
 German Army 1914–1918
 German Army Organization 1914
 
The Nazi German Army 1935-1945 (Heer)
 German Infantry Photographs from World War II—Colour photographs
 Gebirgsjaeger—German Mountain Troops
 Axis History—Axis History site including German troops

 
 
Bundeswehr